Martín Almagro Gorbea (born 5 January 1946 in Barcelona) is a Spanish prehistorian.

He is a professor in prehistory, Ph.D. in history by the "Universidad Complutense de Madrid" with extraordinary prize.

Amalgro Gorbea was elected to medalla nº 11 of the Real Academia de la Historia on 17 February 1995 and he took up his seat on 17 November 1996. Perpetual keeper of antiquities of the Real Academia de la Historia.

In 1998 he became the Director of the National Archaeological Museum succeeding María del Carmen Pérez Díe.

Majoring in  the early history of the Iberian Peninsula and Western Europe, Tartessos, Iberian and Celtic, Ethnogenesis, process of acculturation, Museology, Excavations and Cultural Heritage.

Academic Curriculum 
 Director of the Archaeological Museum of Ibiza.1969-70
 Professor, Department of Prehistory at the Complutense University.1968-76
 Keeper of the National Archaeological Museum.1970-76
 Professor and Director of the University of Valencia.1976-80
 Director of the Spanish School of History and Archeology in Rome.1979-83
 Professor at the Universidad Complutense de Madrid, Doctor in History.1981 -
 Academician of the Royal Academy of History, where he serves as Anticuario perpetuo (keeper of antiquities).1996-
 Director of the National Archaeological Museum.1998-99
commissioner of
 The Celts and Vettones exhibition (Ávila, 2001)
 Hispania, the legacy of Rome (Zaragoza-Mérida, 1998),
 Treasures of the "Real Academia de la Historia" (Madrid, 2001).

Other
 Academician of the Academy of Art and History of San Damaso, his inaugural lecture, was "España desde la prehistoria".
 Member of the Permanent Council of the Union Internationale des Sciences Prehistoriques et Protohistoriques.
 Member of the Royal Basque Society of Friends of the Country, (read his speech income in this society in 2008), 'The origins of the Basques'.

Magazines and publications
Founder-Director of the magazine Complutum, of the Universidad Complutense of Madrid, Saguntum of the University of Valencia and currently directs Bibliotheca Archaeologica Hispana, Antiquaria Hispanica (born 1999), Catalog Cabinet of Antiquities (born 1998) and the Bibliotheca Hispana numismatica (born 2005), of the Royal Academy of History.

Books 
 Los orígenes de los vascos. Martín Almagro Gorbea (aut.). DELEGACIÓN EN CORTE. Departamento de Publicaciones, 2008. 
 La necrópolis de Medellín. I-III (Bibliotheca Archaeologica Hispana 26,1-3) Madrid, 2006-2008. (editor, director y coauthor con J. Jiménez Ávila, A. J. Lorrio, A. Mederos y M. Torres). 
 Medallas Españolas. Catálogo del Gabinete de Antigüedades de la Real Academia de la Historia. Madrid, 2005 (695 p. + 32 láms.) (editor y coautor con Mª Cruz Pérez Alcorta y T. Moneo). 
 Prehistoria. Antigüedades Españolas I. Real Academia de la Historia, Catálogo del Gabinete de Antigüedades. Madrid, 2004, 451 p. (editor y coautor con D. Casado, F. Fontes, A. Mederos, y M. Torres). 
 Segobriga. Guía del Parque Arqueológico. Madrid 55 p. (con Juan Manuel Abascal y Rosario Cebrián)
 Epigrafía Prerromana. Real Academia de la Historia, Catálogo del Gabinete de Antigüedades, Madrid, 2003, 544 p.
 Santuarios urbanos en el mundo ibérico. Martín Almagro Gorbea, Teresa Moneo. Real Academia de la Historia, 2000. 
 Las fíbulas de jinete y de caballito: aproximación a las élites ecuestres y su expansión en la Hispania céltica. Martín Almagro Gorbea, Mariano Torres Ortiz. Institución Fernando el Católico, 1999. 
 El rey-lobo de La Alcudia de Ilici. Alicante, 1999. 52 p. MU-2383-1999
 Las fíbulas de jinete y de caballito: aproximación a las élites ecuestres y su expansión en la Hispania céltica. Martín Almagro Gorbea, Mariano Torres Ortiz. Institución Fernando el Católico, 1999. 
 Segóbriga y su conjunto arqueológico. Martín Almagro Gorbea, Juan Manuel Abascal Palazón. Real Academia de la Historia, 1999. 
 Archivo del Gabinete de Antigüedades: catálogo e índices. Martín Almagro Gorbea, Jesús R. Alvarez Sanchís. Real Academia de la Historia, 1998. 
 Excavaciones en el cerro Ecce Homo: (Alcalá de Henares, Madrid). Martín Almagro Gorbea, Dimas Fernández-Galiano. Madrid: Diputación Provincial. Servicios de Extensión Cultural y Divulgación, D.L. 1980. 
 El bronce final y el periodo orientalizante en Extremadura. Martín Almagro Gorbea. Madrid: Consejo Superior de Investigaciones Científicas. Instituto Español de Prehistoria, 1977. 
 Los campos de túmulos de Pajaroncillo (Cuenca). Excavaciones Arqueológicas en España 83, Madrid 1974, 131 pág.
 La necrópolis de "Las Madrigueras". Carrascosa del Campo (Cuenca) (Bibliotheca Praehistorica Hispana X). Madrid, 1969. 165 p.
 Estudios de Arte rupestre Nubio. I. Sites in East Nile riverside, Nag Kolorodna and Kars Ibrim. (Memorias de la Misión Arqueológica Española en Egipto X), Madrid 1968 (with M. Almagro).

Works summary 
Magazine articles (351)
Contributions in collective works  (188)
Books (20)
Thesis Directed  (39)
Coordination (58 publications)

References

External links
http://www.ua.es/personal/juan.abascal/almagro_gorbea.html
http://dialnet.unirioja.es/servlet/autor?codigo=225403#Libros
https://web.archive.org/web/20090422083345/http://www.elcorreodigital.com/vizcaya/20081101/sociedad/hallazgos-iruna-veleia-broma-20081101.html
  Digitized books of Martín Almagro Gorbea

20th-century Spanish archaeologists
Living people
1946 births
Scientists from Barcelona
Complutense University of Madrid alumni
Members of the Real Academia de la Historia